Jailson Marques Siqueira (born 7 September 1995), simply known as Jailson, is a Brazilian professional footballer who plays as a defensive midfielder for Palmeiras.

Career

Chapecoense
Jailson made his professional debut on 18 March 2015, playing for Chapecoense in a Copa do Brasil match against Interporto, entering the field in the second half of a 5–2 away victory.

Grêmio
In January 2016, Jailson returned to his parent club Grêmio. He made his debut for the club in a 3–2 away loss against São Paulo-RS for the Campeonato Gaúcho. Jailson scored his first professional goal in a 3–3 away draw against former club Chapecoense for the Campeonato Brasileiro.

Fenerbahçe
On 30 August 2018, Jailson joined Süper Lig club Fenerbahçe S.K.

Dalian Pro
On 18 September 2020, Jailson signed with Chinese Super League (CSL) club Dalian Pro. He did not play for the team in 2021 as he was unable to return to China.

Palmeiras
On 7 January 2022, Jailson signed with Palmeiras.

Career statistics

Honours

Club
Grêmio
Copa do Brasil: 2016
Copa Libertadores: 2017
Recopa Sudamericana: 2018
Campeonato Gaúcho: 2018

Palmeiras
 Recopa Sudamericana: 2022
 Campeonato Paulista: 2022
Campeonato Brasileiro Série A: 2022

References

External links

1995 births
Living people
Sportspeople from Rio Grande do Sul
Brazilian footballers
Association football midfielders
Campeonato Brasileiro Série A players
Süper Lig players
Chinese Super League players
Grêmio Foot-Ball Porto Alegrense players
Sociedade Esportiva Palmeiras players
Associação Chapecoense de Futebol players
Fenerbahçe S.K. footballers
Dalian Professional F.C. players
Expatriate footballers in China
Brazilian expatriate sportspeople in China